Wara Alam Shah is a village and union council (administrative subdivision) of Mandi Bahauddin District in the Punjab province of Pakistan. It is located at 32°30'30N 73°16'50E.

References

Villages in Mandi Bahauddin District
Union councils of Mandi Bahauddin District